Lola Jean Albright (July 20, 1924 – March 23, 2017) was an American singer and actress, best known for playing the sultry singer Edie Hart, the girlfriend of private eye Peter Gunn, on all three seasons of the TV series Peter Gunn.

Early years
Albright was born in Akron, Ohio, to Marion A. (née Harvey) and John Paul Albright, both of whom were gospel music singers. Lola's mother also was born in Ohio but her father was a native of North Dakota, who in 1930 supported the family by working as an inspector in a local insulating business.

Albright attended King Grammar School and was graduated from West High School in Akron in 1942. She sang in public at a young age and studied piano for 20 years. Beginning when she was 15 years old, she worked after school as a receptionist at radio station WAKR in Akron.  She left WAKR at the age of 18 and moved to Cleveland, taking a job as a stenographer at WTAM radio. Her first radio performance came on WJW in Cleveland. Moving to Chicago, she worked as a photographer's model and was discovered by a talent scout, which led to her moving to Hollywood at the age of 23.

Film
Albright made her motion-picture debut with a small singing role in the 1947 musical comedy The Unfinished Dance, and then appeared the following year in two Judy Garland movies: The Pirate and Easter Parade.  She first gained studio and public notice in the 1949 film noir production Champion with her portrayal of the wife of a manipulative boxing manager; she falls for a prizefighter played by Kirk Douglas. For the next several years, she appeared in secondary roles in over 20 films, including several B Westerns. Among them was a co-starring role in the slapstick comedy The Good Humor Man in 1950 with future husband Jack Carson.

Some of the films in which Albright appeared were Tulsa (1949), starring Susan Hayward; The Silver Whip (1953), in which she played  Dale Robertson's love interest; and The Tender Trap (1955), in which she was one of several women trying to trap a bachelor, played by Frank Sinatra, into marriage.

In the early 1950s, Albright was also a frequent model for pinup painter Gil Elvgren.

A Cold Wind in August
In 1961, she starred in Alexander Singer's A Cold Wind in Augusta low-budget, black-and-white, independent filmas a divorced burlesque show stripper in her 30s who becomes involved in a torrid romance with a 17-year-old boy.  Critic Pauline Kael offered high praise for Albright's performance. In 1985, The New York Times also lauded Albright's acting in the film. With respect to her personal assessment of her role in A Cold Wind in August, Albright said in 1961, "Some people come up to me and say, 'Lola, you shouldn't play that kind of part. It isn't you.' Well, I count to 10, bite my tongue, and then tell them that I'm an actress: I don't want to play myself."

Later films
Her performance in A Cold Wind in August gave fresh impetus to her film career, leading to roles in Elvis Presley's musical Kid Galahad in 1962, in which she played the hard-boiled, long-time girlfriend of a cynical boxing manager played by Gig Young, and in French director René Clément's Joy House as a wealthy widow with a passion for handing out meals to the poor (albeit with an ulterior motive). In Lord Love a Duck (1966) she portrayed a cocktail waitress who turns suicidal when she thinks she has ruined her daughter Tuesday Weld's life. The next year, she was in the Western epic The Way West.

She gave up her feature-film career in 1968 after completing her work in The Impossible Years, a generation-gap farce in which she performed as Alice Kingsley, the despairing wife of a professor of psychiatry played by David Niven and the mother of two teenaged daughters.

Television

Unlike other film actors who were slow to begin acting in television, Albright was actively working in the medium from 1951. She appeared on the anthology series Lux Video Theatre in the episode "Inside Story". Later she had a recurring role on The Bob Cummings Show in the 1950s, and made guest appearances on television series such as Alfred Hitchcock Presents, The Thin Man, Gunsmoke, Rawhide, Laredo, Burke's Law, The Dick Van Dyke Show, My Three Sons, The Beverly Hillbillies, Bonanza (two episodes), The Man from U.N.C.L.E., Medical Center, Kojak, Columbo, McMillan & Wife, Quincy, M.E., Starsky & Hutch, The Incredible Hulk, and Branded.

In 1958, Albright was cast in Peter Gunn, the television detective series produced by Blake Edwards and scored by Henry Mancini. She played sultry Edie Hart, a nightclub singer and the romantic interest of Peter Gunn (Craig Stevens). "She was perfect casting for that role because she had an off-the-cuff kind of jazz delivery that was very hard to find," Mancini said in 1992. "Just enough to believe that she'd be singing in that club and that she shouldn't be on Broadway or doing movies." Over the course of 114 episodes produced for Peter Gunn, Albright sang in 38 of them, covering jazz classics such as "How High the Moon", "A Good Man Is Hard to Find", "Easy Street", and "Day In, Day Out".

When actress Dorothy Malone had to undergo emergency surgery, Albright filled in for her as the character Constance MacKenzie on the primetime soap opera Peyton Place. At the time, Albright called the role "one of the biggest challenges of my theatrical career." She continued to perform in films and to make guest appearances on television until her retirement in 1984.

Music

Columbia Records signed Albright as a vocalist, leading to the release of her album Lola Wants You in 1957. Albright's subsequent role on Peter Gunn and her performances singing on that series led directly to her second album, Dreamsville (1959), which was arranged by Henry Mancini and featured his orchestra. Albright is one of the few nonmovie-soundtrack singers for whom Mancini arranged.

Recognition
In 1959, Albright was nominated for the Emmy Award for Best Supporting Actress (Continuing Character) in a Dramatic Series for her work on Peter Gunn. In 1966, she won the Silver Bear for Best Actress award at the 16th Berlin International Film Festival for her role in Lord Love a Duck.

Personal life
Albright married and divorced three times. Her first marriage, to Cleveland radio announcer Warren Dean, occurred in 1944. They divorced in 1949. From 1951 to 1958, her second husband was actor Jack Carson, who had been her co-star in The Good Humor Man (1950). (Another source says that they married August 1, 1952, and divorced November 10, 1958.) Her third marriage was to Bill Chadney, who played Emmett, the piano player on Peter Gunn. They married on May 19, 1961, and divorced in 1975. 

Following her retirement from acting, Albright spent her remaining years living in Toluca Lake, California. In 2014, she fell and fractured her spine, an injury that contributed to a general decline in her health over the next three years. 

On March 23, 2017,  Albright died at her home of natural causes at the age of 92.

Filmography

Short subjects:
The Soundman (1950)
Screen Snapshots: Hollywood Cowboy Stars (1955)
Filmmaking on the Riviera (1964)

References

External links

 
 
 
 Profile with 1924 year of birth, familysearch.org; accessed November 25, 2014.
 Lola Albright, Aveleyman.com; accessed September 2, 2017.

1924 births
2017 deaths
20th-century American actresses
Actresses from Akron, Ohio
Actresses from Hollywood, Los Angeles
American women singers
American film actresses
American television actresses
Silver Bear for Best Actress winners
Singers from Ohio
Western (genre) film actresses
21st-century American women